Den siste revejakta is a Norwegian film from 2008 based on the novel by the same name. The movie is a comedy/drama. It was filmed in 2007 and premiered on 29 August 2008. The movie is directed by Ulrik Imtiaz Rolfsen.

The title Den siste revejakta literally means 'The Last Fox Hunt', but the title is a play on words since the Norwegian word 'rev' can mean reefer. According to the IMDb, the international title is "The Last Joint Venture".

Cast 
Kristoffer Joner as Carl
Nicolai Cleve Broch as Robert
Thomas Bo Larsen as Mogens
Emilie K. Beck	as Betty
Kåre Conradi as Glenn
Gard Eidsvold as Arild
Hans Henrik Verpe as Christian

References

External links
 

2008 films
Norwegian comedy-drama films
2000s Norwegian-language films
Films about cannabis
Films based on Norwegian novels
Cannabis in Norway
2008 in cannabis